Mensch is a Yiddish word meaning a person of integrity and honor, from the German word for human being.

Mensch may also refer to:

People
Bill Mensch (born 1945), American electrical engineer
Bob Mensch (born 1945), American Republican politician
David Mensch (born 1972), Australian Rules footballer
Daniël Mensch (born 1978), Dutch rower
Hannelore Mensch (born 1937), German politician
Homer Mensch (1914–2005)), American classical double bass player
Louise Mensch (born 1971), British author and politician
Peter van Mensch (born 1947), Dutch museologist
Peter Mensch (born 1953), musical acts manager

Other
Mensch (album), a 2002 album by Herbert Grönemeyer
"Mensch" (song), the title song from album above
Mensch Computer, named after Bill Mensch
Mensch on a Bench, a stuffed toy

See also